Cysteine-rich with EGF-like domain protein 2 is a protein that in humans is encoded by the CRELD2 gene.

References

External links

Further reading